George Hamilton (born 2 January 1950) is an Irish broadcaster born in Belfast, Northern Ireland. He is best known as the chief football commentator for RTÉ, for which he also commentates on other sporting events, such as the Olympic Games. He presents a classical music programme on RTÉ lyric fm on Saturdays and Sundays called The Hamilton Scores.

Early life and education

Hamilton was christened in the same Presbyterian church as George Best. His father Jimmy played for Cliftonville F.C., but George was a Glentoran F.C. ‘superfan’.

While a student at Methodist College, Belfast, Hamilton was, for a time, principal cellist with the school orchestra. He then studied German and French at Queen's University, Belfast.

Broadcasting career
Hamilton began his commentary career with BBC Sport, before joining RTÉ eight years later in 1984. He had previously worked for RTÉ during the 1978 FIFA World Cup. Since 2003, he has worked for RTÉ lyric fm (Ireland's classical radio station) on Saturday mornings. For many years, he fronted a popular weekly quiz show on RTÉ, Know Your Sport, alongside fellow commentator Jimmy Magee.	

Hamilton was chief commentator for RTÉ Sport's coverage of the 2010 FIFA World Cup in South Africa, the ninth one in which he has been involved. Hamilton was RTÉ's chief commentator at Euro 2012, and commentated on all of Ireland's matches in the competition. He has been involved in the coverage of the Olympic Games since the 1980 Moscow Olympics.

Memorable quotes
Hamilton is known for his use of colourful phrases and memorable quotes when commentating on games, his phrase describing David O'Leary's penalty against Romania in the 1990 World Cup, "The nation holds its breath", was used for a book of Irish football quotations, compiled by Eoghan Corry, for which Hamilton wrote the foreword.

The sports humour website, DangerHere.com, takes its title from another quote by Hamilton: "And Bonner has gone 165 minutes of these championships without conceding a goal. Oh danger here..."

Other examples
"Real Madrid are like a rabbit in the glare of the headlights in the face of Manchester United's attacks. But this rabbit comes with a suit of armour in the shape of two precious away goals"
"And Ireland have got to contain the brothers Baggio." [Later in the game…] "The Baggio brothers, of course, are not related"
"When I said they'd scored two goals, of course I meant they'd scored one"

Personal life
On 16 August 2011, he felt unwell and had a suspected heart attack, and later had several hours of emergency bypass surgery at the Blackrock Clinic in Dublin after being transferred from St. Vincent's University Hospital. He recovered, and resumed both his commentating and radio show.

References

External links
 George Hamilton at RTÉ lyric fm

1951 births
Irish association football commentators
Irish Independent people
Living people
People educated at Methodist College Belfast
Presbyterians from Northern Ireland
RTÉ lyric fm presenters
RTÉ television presenters
Television personalities from Belfast